Süstedt is a village and a former municipality in the district of Diepholz, in Lower Saxony, Germany. Since 1 November 2016, it is part of the municipality Bruchhausen-Vilsen.

References

Diepholz (district)
Former municipalities in Lower Saxony